María Félix: La Doña is a Mexican biographical streaming television series produced by Carmen Armendáriz for TelevisaUnivision. It premiered on the streaming service Vix+ on 21 July 2022 and ended on 1 September 2022. The series tells the story of Mexican actress and singer María Félix, based on reporting and testimony from those closest to Félix. It stars Sandra Echeverría, Ximena Romo and Abril Vergara, who all portray María Félix at different stages of her life.

Cast 
 Sandra Echeverría as María Félix
 Ximena Romo as young María Félix
 Abril Vergara as child María Félix
 Guillermo García Cantú
 Úrsula Pruneda
 Emiliano González
 Aída López
 Iker Madrid
 Markin López
 Claudio Lafarga
 Epy Vélez
 Ana Bertha Espín
 Helena Rojo
 Josh Gutiérrez
 Axel Ricco
 Juan Martín Jáuregui
 Eduardo Manzano
 Ramón Medina
 Enoc Leaño
 Ximena Ayala
 Mauricio Salas Elizondo
 Marius Biegai
 Luis Felipe Montoya
 David Caro Levy

Production

Development 
On 16 February 2022, the series was announced as one of the titles for TelevisaUnivision's streaming platform Vix+. Production of the series began on 14 March 2022.

Episodes

References

External links 
 

2020s Mexican television series
2022 Mexican television series debuts
2022 Mexican television series endings
Television series by Televisa
Spanish-language television shows
Biographical television series
Vix (streaming service) original programming